Patrick Eddie is a former American basketball player who played center in the National Basketball Association for the New York Knicks during the 1991–92 NBA season.  He was the head coach of the Heritage Christian High School Varsity basketball team in 2012–13 and 2013–14. Eddie played college basketball for Arkansas State and Ole Miss.

References

1967 births
Living people
American men's basketball players
Arkansas State Red Wolves men's basketball players
Basketball players from Milwaukee
Centers (basketball)
New York Knicks players
Ole Miss Rebels men's basketball players
Undrafted National Basketball Association players